Senator Starr may refer to:

Bruce Starr (born 1969), Oregon State Senate
Charles Starr (born 1933), Oregon State Senate
David Starr (politician), New Hampshire State Senate
Harry W. Starr (1879–1934), Illinois State Senate
Robert A. Starr (born 1942), Vermont State Senate
Terrell Starr (1925–2009), Georgia State Senate
Sol Star (1840–1917), South Dakota State Senate